Neurotica is the fourth record and second LP from the band Redd Kross. It was released on Big Time Records (an RCA Records subsidiary) in 1987. Observed to be a blend of various genres including garage rock, power pop, punk rock, art rock and pop rock, the album was influential to the grunge movement.

Track listing 
All songs written by Jeff McDonald, except where noted.
"Neurotica" (Steven Shane McDonald, Robert Hecker, J. McDonald) -  2:57
"Play My Song" - 3:37
"Frosted Flake" (S. McDonald, J. McDonald) - 2:05
"Janus, Jeanie, and George Harrison" - 3:13
"Love is You" (R. Hecker) - 2:31
"Peach Kelli Pop" - 3:36
"McKenzie" - 4:28
"Tatum O' Tot and the Fried Vegetables" - 1:27  - (CD bonus track)
"Ballad of a Love Doll" - 1:55 - (from the Desperate Teenage Lovedolls movie soundtrack)
"What They Say" (R. Hecker) - 3:59
"Gandhi Is Dead (I'm the Cartoon Man)" - 3:25
"Beautiful Bye-Byes" (R. Hecker, J. McDonald, S. McDonald) - 1:48
"Pink Piece Of Peace" (R. Hecker) - 1:38 - (bonus track on 2002 CD version)
"It's The Little Things" (Sonny Bono) - 3:53 - (bonus track on 2002 CD version)

Related information
 Recorded at American Recorders, Los Angeles, California
 The album was produced by ex-Ramones drummer Tommy Erdelyi.
 To promote the album Big Time Records issued the promotional-only double album Dinner With Redd Kross. Disk one featured an interview with the band conducted by Albert O of WBCN-FM and the album versions of the songs "Peach Kelli Pop", "Love Is You", "Neurotica", "Janus Jeanie and George Harrison", "McKenzie" and "Play My Song". Disk two contained "Play My Song", remixed by Michael Frondelli, on red vinyl. The Frondelli remix is also available on CD on The Big Time Syndrome compilation.
 "McKenzie" is about Mackenzie Phillips.
 "Love Is You" has appeared in the 1987 film The Allnighter, and in the 2011 film Losers Take All.
 A number of tracks were remixed by Steven McDonald and Jon Auer for the 2002 reissue on Five Foot Two Records.
 The 2002 reissue included two bonus tracks: Robert Hecker's "Pink Piece of Peace", and Sonny Bono's "It's The Little Things".
 Another version of "Pink Piece of Peace" is on the first It's OK! album, featuring Redd Kross members Robert Hecker and Victor Indrizzo.

Members
Roy McDonald - drums
Steven Shane McDonald - bass, vocals
Robert Hecker - guitar, vocals
Jeff McDonald - vocals, guitar

References

1987 albums
Redd Kross albums